Rishikesh Narayanan (born 1974) is an Indian neuroscientist, computer engineer and a professor at the Molecular Biophysics Unit (MBU) of the Indian Institute of Science. He is the principal investigator at the Cellular Neurophysiology Laboratory of MBU where his team is engaged in researches on experimental and theoretical aspects of information processing in single neurons and their networks. The Council of Scientific and Industrial Research, the apex agency of the Government of India for scientific research, awarded him the Shanti Swarup Bhatnagar Prize for Science and Technology, one of the highest Indian science awards, in 2016, for his contributions to biological sciences.

Biography 
Rishikesh Narayanan, born on 5 June 1974 at Virudhunagar in the south Indian state of Tamil Nadu, graduated in electronics and communication engineering from Mepco Schlenk Engineering College of Madurai Kamaraj University in 1995 and obtained a master's degree by research in engineering working under Y. V. Venkatesh from the Indian Institute of Science in 1997; his thesis for the degree was Neural architectures for active contour modelling and for pulseencoded shape recognition. He continued his doctoral studies under Venkatesh at IISc and secured a PhD for his thesis, A computational model for the development of simple-cell receptive fields spanning the regimes before and after eye-opening in 2002 after which he enrolled as a post-doctoral fellow under Sumantra Chattarji at National Centre for Biological Sciences. In 2004, he moved to the University of Texas at Austin on a second post-doctoral fellowship where he was mentored by Daniel Johnston. While at the university, he also did a three-month summer research stint at Marine Biological Laboratory during June–August 2008. Returning to India in 2009, he joined IISc as an assistant professor at the Molecular Biophysics Unit, became an associate professor in 2015 and is the head of the Cellular Neurophysiology Laboratory where he hosts a number of research scholars.

Narayanan, who teaches specialized courses at IISc, has published in peer-reviewed journals. He is a member of the Neurobiology Task Force of the Department of Biotechnology of the Government of India and several science societies including Society for Neuroscience, Molecular and Cellular Cognition Society, American Physiological Society and Biophysical Society. He is a reviewer for journals such as eLife, Frontiers in Cellular Neuroscience, Journal of Computational Neuroscience, Journal of Neurophysiology, Journal of Neuroscience, Journal of Physiology, Neuroscience, PLOS Computational Biology and has organized or participated in several conferences and seminars at IISc and outside. He was awarded the Shanti Swarup Bhatnagar Prize for Science and Technology, one of the highest Indian science awards, by the Council of Scientific and Industrial Research in 2016.

Selected bibliography

See also 
 Hippocampus
 Dendrite

Notes

References

External links

Further reading 
 

Recipients of the Shanti Swarup Bhatnagar Award in Biological Science
Living people
Indian scientific authors
Indian Institute of Science alumni
Academic staff of the Indian Institute of Science
1974 births
Scientists from Tamil Nadu
Tamil scientists
Madurai Kamaraj University alumni
National Centre for Biological Sciences
University of Texas at Austin alumni
Indian neuroscientists